is a 2016 rhythm game featuring the character Hatsune Miku, created by Sega and Crypton Future Media, released on March 24, 2016 for the PlayStation Vita in Japan. A North American and European version has been released for PlayStation 4 and PlayStation Vita on August 30, 2016. The title reflects the game being the 10th entry in the Hatsune Miku: Project DIVA series (including the Dreamy Theater games and both versions of Hatsune Miku: Project DIVA F). The game takes a new approach to play style, focusing around the theme of "Live and Produce".

Development
The game was publicly announced on August 31, 2015 via a video preview.

The character modules are designed by Tokichi, Akiakane, Tama, iXima, Hachi, Hoshima, Amemura, PinocchioP, Awashima, Gagame, 456, Suzunosuke, Saine, Nagimiso, toi8, and Rella. The full original cast from the previous game is set to be present in Project DIVA X with KAITO and MEIKO now taking on appearances from their Vocaloid 3 boxart.

Gameplay
The core gameplay is of a similar play style to Hatsune Miku: Project DIVA F, removing the double star notes and link stars introduced in Hatsune Miku: Project DIVA F 2nd. The game also introduces "rush notes", for which the player is to rapidly press the corresponding button in order to increase their score. A new "Cloud Request / Live Quest" mode takes center focus over the traditional free play mode. The game now centers around the "home" menu, which is an adapted version of earlier titles "diva room", where the player can interact with the Vocaloids. "Home" also replaces the traditional main menu.

Cloud Request / Live Quest Mode involves the player completing quests by playing songs. In between missions, short interactions and visual novel style dialogues may play out between the player and Vocaloids.  The mode consists of two main types of quests - Cloud Requests / Area Quests and Event Requests / Event Quests. Cloud Requests / Area Quests simply require a song to be completed while gaining a certain score. Later quests throw in other challenges (such as the "cool" pop up randomly changing to "miss" and "sad"). Event Requests / Event Quests have special requirements such as requiring the player to play a "festival / special live" consisting of 3 songs in a row. The game also features new "medley" songs, which are fully playable compilations of popular returning and new tracks. The full versions of the songs comprising the medleys cannot be played in full.

In Cloud Request / Live Quest Mode, modules (costumes), accessories and songs are assigned an aura / element, either Classic / Regular, Cool, Cute, Elegant / Beauty, or Quirky / Chaos. These elements also correspond to the 5 "areas" the songs are sorted within. By matching songs with a module and accessories of the same element, the initial "voltage" is increased. Modules are also assigned skills, for example, increasing the voltage for every 20 notes hit. The voltage increases the score gained for each successful note. The "Diva Points" used in previous entries have been removed, as modules are now acquired through a new feature called "Module Drop". Module Drop is triggered by the success of chance time, causing a random module to be dropped. Certain modules are classified as "rare" and may only drop during certain quests. If the conditions of the quest are cleared, the player acquires the module and is then able to freely use it in both Live Quest and Free Play modes. Previously obtained modules may still drop during quests.

In Free Play mode, the player is able to customise the modules, stage and module dropped. Elements and skills are absent in this mode. Free Play mode follows the traditional scoring system of previous Project Diva games where the player must build up Grade Points to acquire a ranking of Standard, Great, Excellent or Perfect, as opposed to reaching a voltage goal alike to the Live Quest mode. Certain extra DLC characters may only be used in Free Play mode. Other modes include "Concert Editor / Live Edit" in which the player is able to customise camera angles and effects of full versions of the songs included in the game. The game does not feature a traditional edit mode and custom song edits cannot be made. "Portrait / Photo" mode returns from Project Diva F 2nd, allowing the player to take pictures of the Vocaloids.

Song list
The base game contains a total of 30 playable songs (not including Ievan Polkka as the tutorial BGM), 6 of which are medleys, and 4 which return from previous entries in the Hatsune Miku: Project DIVA or Project Mirai series. The game also has 2 DLC songs released post launch that are available for purchase on the PlayStation Store

Controversy
Hatsune Miku: Project DIVA X was banned in South Korea because the song "Holy Lance Explosion Boy" has R-18 themed lyrics.

Reception
Hatsune Miku: Project DIVA X received generally favorable reviews. Critics  praised the game for its Live Quest story mode and visuals, but criticized the game's "lack of content"; being its song selection (without DLC), lack of an in-game shop, and having to play the game's story mode repeatedly to unlock modules via Module Drop sequences.

The game received a 78% score on Metacritic.

References

External links
 (Japanese)
 (English)

2016 video games
Hatsune Miku: Project DIVA games
Music video games
PlayStation 4 games
PlayStation Vita games
Sega video games
PlayStation 4 Pro enhanced games
Video games developed in Japan